The Saviour Church on Nereditsa Hill near Novgorod (Tserkov Spasa na Nereditse) is a 12th-century Orthodox church dedicated to the feast of the Saviour's Transfiguration. 

The church, consecrated in 1198, became world-famous both for its remarkable state of exterior preservation and for the best preserved set of pre-Mongol wall paintings in the Russian Empire. During the World War II it was selected as a target for artillery fire and was reduced to rubble.

The post-war reconstruction of the Nereditsa Church is on the World Heritage list as a part of object 604 Historic Monuments of Novgorod and Surroundings. The building has been designated an architectural monument of federal significance (#5310113002).

History
The church was built in 1198 by Prince Yaroslav Vladimirovich, the grandson of  Mstislav Vladimirovich and painted with frescoes in 1199.

During World War II the church was located on the front line between 1941 and 1943 and was destroyed. It was subsequently restored. However, most of the frescoes could not be saved. They are currently known from pre-war photos, and watercolor sketches made by Nikolai Avenirovich Martynov in 1862.

Architecture

The small stone church is built as a cube and has one dome. It is based on four pillars and has three apses at the eastern side. The type of a small church was developed in Novgorod in the end of the 12th century, and there are several churches of this type, in Novgorod and in Staraya Ladoga.

Frescoes
The frescoes were created by eight to ten artists. They covered all the interior of the church, including the pillars, the walls, the ceiling, and the dome. There is no apparent system in creating the frescoes. It's possible that the painters did not know each other and had different styles. In particular, normally a fresco of Christ the Saviour should be painted in the dome. However, for the Saviour Church on Nereditsa, the dome was occupied by the Ascencion. Christ was painted in the dome in Byzantine Empire already in the 9th century, and painting other frescoes in the dome was at the time the sign that the church belongs to a highly peripheral region. The most impressive fresco in the church was considered to be the Last Judgment, painted over the whole western wall. Only fragments of this fresco survived.

References

Buildings and structures completed in 1198
Russian Orthodox churches in Veliky Novgorod
Medieval Eastern Orthodox church buildings in Russia
Historic Monuments of Novgorod and Surroundings
Rebuilt churches in Russia
12th-century paintings
Cultural heritage monuments of federal significance in Novgorod Oblast